Apabhraṃśa (Prakrit: , ,) is a term used by vaiyākaraṇāḥ (native grammarians) since Patañjali to refer to languages spoken in North India before the rise of the modern languages. In Indology, it is used as an umbrella term for the dialects forming the transition between the late Middle and the early Modern Indo-Aryan languages, spanning the period between the 6th and 13th centuries CE. However, these dialects are conventionally included in the Middle Indo-Aryan period.  in Sanskrit literally means "corrupt" or "non-grammatical language", that which deviates from the norm of Sanskrit grammar.

Apabhraṃśa literature is a valuable source for the history of North India for the period spanning the 12th to 16th centuries.

Overview
The term Prakrit, which includes Pali, is also used as a cover term for the vernaculars of North India that were spoken perhaps as late as the 4th to 8th centuries, but some scholars use the term for the entire Middle Indo-Aryan period. Middle Indo-Aryan languages gradually transformed into Apabhraṃśa dialects, which were used until about the 13th century. The Apabhraṃśas later evolved into Modern Indo-Aryan languages. The boundaries of these periods are somewhat hazy, not strictly chronological. Modern North Indian languages are often considered to have begun to develop a distinct identity around the 11th century – while Apabhraṃśas were still in use – and became fully distinct by the end of the 12th century.

A significant amount of Apabhraṃśa literature has been found in Jain libraries. While Amir Khusrow and Kabir were writing in a language quite similar to modern Urdu and Hindi respectively, many poets, especially in regions that were still ruled by Hindu kings, continued to write in Apabhraṃśa. These authors include Saraha, Tilopa and Kanha of Kamarupa; Devasena of Dhar (9th century CE); Pushpadanta of Manyakheta (9th century CE); Dhanapal; Muni Ramsimha; Hemachandra of Patan; and Raidhu of Gwalior (15th century CE).

An early example of the use of Apabhraṃśa is the Vikramorvashiyam of Kālidāsa, when Pururavas asks the animals in the forest about his beloved who had disappeared. Compositions in Apabhramsha continued until the 18th century, when Bhagavatidasa wrote Migankaleha Chariu.

The only known example of an Apabhraṃśa work by a Muslim is the Sandeśarāsaka of Abdur Rahman of Multan, possibly written around 1000 CE.

Writers and poets   
Below is the list of some of the eminent writers and poets of Apabhraṃśa literature:

Mahakavi Swyambhudev (8th century CE)
 Ritthanemichariu
 Pauma-Chariu
Mahakavi Pushpadant (10th century)
 Mahapuran 
 Naykumarchariu 
 Jasaharchariu
Hemachandra (12th century)
Abdur Rahman (Addahamāṇa) (12th century) – Multani poet who penned the epic romance Sandeśarāsaka in Apabhraṃśa.
 Padmanābha who wrote Kanhadade Prabandha (15th century)

See also
Hindavi
History of Hindustani

Notes

References
 Shapiro, Michael C. Hindi. Facts about the world's languages: An encyclopedia of the world's major languages, past and present. Ed. Jane Garry, and Carl Rubino: New England Publishing Associates, 2001.

External links
 Dr. Devendra Kumar Shastri
 Hindi: The language of songs
 

Indo-Aryan languages
Languages attested from the 6th century
Languages extinct in the 13th century
Languages of India
Linguistic history of India
Medieval languages
Formal languages used for Indian scriptures
North India